Maria Van Bommel is a Canadian former politician in Ontario, Canada. From 2003 to 2011, she was a member of the Legislative Assembly of Ontario, representing the London area riding of Lambton—Kent—Middlesex for the Ontario Liberal Party.

Politics
In the 2003 provincial election, she defeated incumbent Progressive Conservative Marcel Beaubien by about 3,500 votes in Lambton—Kent—Middlesex, a predominantly rural riding in the southwest region of the province.

She was defeated by Monte McNaughton in the 2011 provincial election by nearly 7,000 votes.

References

External links
 

21st-century Canadian politicians
21st-century Canadian women politicians
Living people
Ontario Liberal Party MPPs
People from Middlesex County, Ontario
Politicians from London, Ontario
Women MPPs in Ontario
Year of birth missing (living people)